A crime scene is a location where a crime took place.

Crime Scene may also refer to:

 Crime Scene (Dakrya album), 2010
 Crime Scene (Terje Rypdal album), 2009
 Crime Scene (American TV program), a crime investigation program broadcast by Fox News and hosted by Greta Van Susteren
 Crime Scene (South Korean TV series), a South Korean TV series
 Tatort (English title: Crime Scene), a long-running German/Austrian/Swiss crime television series
 Crime Scene (video game), an adventure game for the Nintendo DS
 Crime Scene (website), established in 1995 
 "The Crime Scene", an episode of the sixth season of Brooklyn Nine-Nine
 Crime Scene (docuseries), a Netflix docuseries directed by Joe Berlinger

See also 

 Scene of the Crime (disambiguation)